Virgin Cola was a carbonated cola soft drink, launched in 1994.

History 
Virgin Cola was set up during the early 1990s in conjunction with Cott, an American-Canadian company that specialises in bottling own-label drinks. Cott was looking for a major international brand that could have worldwide appeal. Virgin Group founder, Richard Branson was looking to widen the Virgin name and to rival the Coca-Cola and Pepsi brands.

Virgin Cola began to hit international shores within its first year. The UK first served the drink on Virgin Atlantic flights, on-board shops on Virgin Trains and also at Virgin Cinemas.  The Gulliver's Kingdom chain of theme parks in the UK also sold post-mix Virgin Cola. This led Virgin Cola to agree a distribution deal with British supermarket retailer Tesco in 1994.
 
From 1996, the 500 ml bottles were marketed as "The Pammy", as their curves were designed to resemble Pamela Anderson who was at the height of her popularity in the UK at the time. It went on to be launched in France, Belgium and South Africa.

In 1998, Branson attended the USA launch of Virgin Cola driving a T-54/55 tank into New York City's Times Square. It subsequently agreed distribution channels with US retailers such as Target. Virgin Drinks USA, the company dealing in Virgin Cola's US market, closed in April 2001, having managed to establish just a 0.5% share of the market by volume.

In 1999, a bottle of Virgin Cola can be seen on the coffee table in Monica and Rachel's apartment during the 4 February U.S. airing of the Friends episode entitled "The One with Joey's Bag." Branson had previously appeared in an episode and was said to be a fan of the show. A can of Virgin Cola appeared in Ally McBeal in the title character's refrigerator in the episode "Love Unlimited," first aired on 18 January 1999. In season 4 episode 10 of Buffy the Vampire Slayer (The Hush), Willow is seen drinking a can of Virgin Cola in a scene with Buffy.

In 2002, a vanilla cola called Virgin Vanilla was launched in the UK, ahead of the launch of a similar product from rival Coca-Cola. In 2004, it was announced that Virgin Vanilla would be discontinued in order to focus on the teenage market.

Decline 

A campaign was run by The Coca-Cola Company against Virgin and its Virgin Cola product. Originally Coca-Cola did not treat Virgin as a serious competitor but when Virgin started outselling Coke in the United Kingdom and entered the American market, Coke realised it needed to do something. At the suggestion of a British female Coca-Cola executive, Coke assembled SWAT teams to fly to the UK on a hired DC-10 from Atlanta International Airport with suitcases of money for an influencing campaign. Its intent was to make deals with retailers that sold Coke and Virgin Cola to get Virgin Cola removed from the shelves and to threaten them with the removal of Coca-Cola fridges if they refused. Branson admitted Virgin did not know this was going on and it eventually led to a drop in sales and Virgin Cola ceasing to be sold outside of Virgin companies. Later the Coke executive would work for Lloyds TSB and would become the manager of Virgin Group's bank accounts to which Branson, when he found out from her at a dinner, said "I wasn't sure whether to strangle her or not" but forgave her for it.

In 2007, Silver Spring acquired the UK licence from Princes Group. However, the company stopped producing Virgin Cola by early 2009, though would hold on to the license until it fell into administration in 2012. No company acquired Virgin Cola's UK licence in its place. It is unclear as to when the drink officially ceased production, as it appeared to still be briefly available in certain international markets following the production ceasing in the UK.

Legacy
The story of the drink and its subsequent rise and decline has been the subject of numerous articles and interviews, especially in relation to marketing, business and the wider story of Branson and the Virgin Group.

See also
 List of defunct consumer brands

References

External links
Virgin Drinks

Cola brands
Cola
Products introduced in 1994
Drink companies of Canada
Food and drink companies established in 1994
Canadian companies established in 1994
2007 establishments in England
2012 disestablishments in England
Defunct companies based in Kent